Froggie's Stopping Place on the Whoop-Up Trail, also known as Lucille and as Midway Station, is a site on the National Register of Historic Places located in Conrad, Montana.  It has been used as a hotel and Post Office. It was added to the Register on April 15, 1993.

Historically it consisted of a house, a post office (which possibly was incorporated into the house), a school, a barn or barns, and a windmill.  In 1991 it consisted of three cobble foundations, some scattered depression features, and an area of pasture land in which a portion of the historic Whoop-Up Trail was still faintly visible.

See also 
 Macleod-Benton Trail

References

Commercial buildings on the National Register of Historic Places in Montana
National Register of Historic Places in Pondera County, Montana
Buildings and structures completed in 1870
1870 in Montana Territory
Archaeological sites on the National Register of Historic Places in Montana
Whoop-Up Trail